

This page lists board and card games, wargames, miniatures games, and tabletop role-playing games published in 1981.  For video games, see 1981 in video gaming.

Games released or invented in 1981

Game awards given in 1981
 Spiel des Jahres: Focus

Significant games-related events in 1981
Amarillo Design Bureau founded.

See also
 1981 in video gaming

Games
Games by year